Madhavayya Gari Manavadu is a 1992 Telugu-language drama film, produced by V. Doraswamy Raju under the VMC Productions banner and directed by Muthyala Subbaiah. It stars Akkineni Nageswara Rao, Sujatha, Harish  and music composed by Vidyasagar.

Plot 
The film begins in a village where Madhavayya (Akkineni Nageswara Rao) a millionaire, is benevolent & flirtatious, leads a happy life with his ideal wife Madhavi (Sujatha) and grandson Vamsi Krishna (Harish) who reared under the pampering of his grandparents as an innocent and they love him boundlessly. As Vamsi is the only heir to Madhavayya, he is surrounded by so many relatives and plot to usurp his wealth. Once Madhavayya discovers Vamsi is seriously ill and immediately takes him to Bombay for the treatment along with his brother's son Dr. Satyam (Rallapalli). On the way, an awful incident Vamsi dies in an accident which Madhavayya hides from Madhavi as he doesn't want to lose her too. After a few days, Madhavi arranges a warm welcome assuming as it is the day of arrival of Vamsi. At that juncture, perturbed Madhavayya is about to break up when staggeringly, a person who resembles Vamsi (again Harish) comes in. Right now, Madhavayya is in dichotomy, but maintains silence in order to shield his wife and tries to discover the reality but fails. Parallelly, alike Vamsi is very smart & intelligent who does all good works, encounters evildoers both in the house & office and makes Madhavayya proud. At that point in time, Madhavayya starts liking him, ready to flourish his affection but requests for the fact then he reacts the reason behind his homecoming is to take avenge against him. Thereafter, they challenge, unfortunately, Madhavi overhears the conversation, pleads alike Vamsi to do not suffer her husband. There, he declares himself as their son's first wife's son Vamsi Mohan who has renounced due to the depravity of Madhavayya. Eventually, Madhavayya also learns the veracity. On the other side, Satyam divulges the secret to remaining black hats and they intrigue against Vamsi Mohan when Madhavayya cleverly safeguards him and ceases baddies. Here Vamsi understands the virtue of his grandfather and seeks pardon from him. Finally, the movie ends on a happy note by Madhavayya affirming Vamsi Mohan as his grandson.

Cast
Akkineni Nageswara Rao as Madhavayya 
Sujatha as Madhavi
Harish as Vamsi Krishna & Vamsi Mohan (Dual role)
Narra Venkateswara Rao as Arjuna Rao
Rallapalli as Dr. Satyam
Mallikarjuna Rao as Manager Ananda Rao
Suthi Velu as Srimannarayana
Babu Mohan as Madhavayya's servant
Nandini as Radha
Chandrika
Saraswathi as Shakuntala 
Jaya Shanthi as Pushpa

Soundtrack

Music composed by Vidyasagar. Lyrics were written by Veturi. Music released on LEO Audio Company.

References

Indian drama films
Films scored by Vidyasagar